South Korea Songs is a music record chart in South Korea, compiled by Billboard since May 2022. The chart is updated every Tuesday on Billboards website. It is part of Billboards Hits of the World chart collection, ranking the top 25 songs weekly in more than 40 countries around the globe.

The first number-one song on the chart was "Still Life" by Big Bang on the issue dated May 7, 2022. The chart's current number-one song is "Ditto" by NewJeans, on the week ending on March 18, 2023.

Methodology 
The chart tracks songs' performance from Friday to Thursday. Chart rankings are based on digital downloads from full-service digital music retailers (sales from direct-to-consumer sites such as an individual artist's store are excluded) and online streaming occurring in South Korea during the tracking period. All data are provided by Luminate Data, formerly MRC Data.

List of number-one songs

Song milestones

Most weeks at number one

Artist milestones

Most number-one songs

Most weeks at number one

References

External links
 Current South Korea Songs chart
 Billboard charts

Billboard charts
2022 establishments in South Korea
South Korean record charts